Mioptachys is a genus of beetles in the family Carabidae, containing the following species:

 Mioptachys autumnalis (Bates, 1882)
 Mioptachys cruciger (Bates, 1871)
 Mioptachys cucujoides (Bates, 1882)
 Mioptachys flavicauda (Say, 1823)
 Mioptachys insularis (Darlington, 1939)
 Mioptachys melanius (Bates, 1871)
 Mioptachys neotropicus (Csiki, 1928)
 Mioptachys noctis (Darlington, 1935)
 Mioptachys ocularis (Casey, 1918)
 Mioptachys oopteroides Bates, 1882
 Mioptachys parallelus (Bates, 1871)
 Mioptachys trechoides Bates, 1882
 Mioptachys xanthura (Bates, 1871)

References

Trechinae